General elections were held in Costa Rica on 9 February 1936. León Cortés Castro of the Independent National Republican Party won the presidential election, whilst the party also won the parliamentary election, in which they received 59.4% of the vote. Voter turnout was 68.8% in the presidential election and 68.9% in the parliamentary election.

Campaign
The Communist Party of Costa Rica manages to register as a political party for the first time in Costa Rican history.

While there was, again, a movement seeking the re-election of Ricardo Jiménez Oreamuno, he rejected it emphatically arguing that such a thing went against democracy. Cortés resigned his portfolio as Secretary of Development with clear presidential interests and the cortesismo is gradually taking the reins of Congress and the Republican Party. However, Cortés has many detractors, especially for his sympathies with Nazism, and the opposition tries to select a candidate to face it. The ex-president Julio Acosta was temporarily pre-candidate but finally renounces his aspirations by lack of support, and Alberto Echandi declines to participate as a candidate against Cortés, citing questions of honor, since he was in debt to him. Nor is it possible to convince Alfredo González Flores or Dr. Moreno Cañas to launch their candidacies. This leads the opponent Carlos María Jiménez Ortiz to assure that in said election it was necessary to choose between; "Cortesism or communism, the extreme right and the extreme left, fascism and sovietism." But finally the diplomat and former president of the Supreme Court Octavio Beeche Argüello accepts being a candidate for the National Party.

During the campaign there were strong attacks. Beeche was accused of being a foreigner and communist while Cortés was labeled as authoritarian, fascist and tyrant. It was the first election in which the newly founded Costa Rican Communist Party participated under the nomenclature of the Workers 'and Peasants' Bloc. Its original candidate, Manuel Mora Valverde, had to be replaced by the writer Carlos Luis Sáenz since Mora did not have the minimum age of 30 the Constitution required to be president.

During the campaign Cortés used a rabid anti-Communist discourse, positioning himself as the "champion" that would protect the country against that doctrine.

The vote for the Congress was almost identical, obtaining the party of Cortés 59%, Beeche's vote exactly the same amount (34%) and the Workers 'and Peasants' Bloc a little more of parliamentary votes than presidential votes with 6%.

Results

President

Parliament

References

1936 elections in Central America
1936 in Costa Rica
Elections in Costa Rica